Beaunay is a commune in the Marne department in northeastern France.

Population

Personalities
Beaunay is the birthplace of thoroughbred racehorse trainer, François Boutin.

See also
Communes of the Marne department

References

Communes of Marne (department)